Flight 32 may refer to:

Overseas National Airways Flight 032, overran the runway on 12 November 1975
SANSA Flight 32, crashed on 15 January 1990
Qantas Flight 32, had an engine failure on 4 November 2010

0032